Islamic Education Trust (in abbreviation commonly as IET) is an Islamic Non-Governmental Organization established on 16th Ramadan 1379AH equivalent to 18th November 1969 and registered with the Federal Government of Nigeria in 1972  situated in Minna, Nigeria.

Foundation 
It was on Thursday evening, the 16th of November 1969, Shaikh Ahmed Lemu and his wife Aisha Lemu who were already a couple and their friends were discussing the challenges facing Muslims communities in Nigeria with a regards to enhance the Islamic education and development of Muslims in the country. In the discussion, Aisha Bridget who was the youngest amongst them asked, Why don’t we establish our own organisation and do the things we are urging others to do?..  The group of them replies back to her question, 'Why not?' and Ashafa replied with a question,'When?' and the group of them which are friends replied back, 'Now!'. This came all in the challenges facing the Nigeria Muslims community education, the Islamic Educational Trust was founded by them in 1969.

First military coup d'etat of Nigeria 1966
In January 1966 was the first brought of the Military junta coup d'état in Nigeria, Sir Ahmadu Bello the Premier of Northern Region and Sardauna of Sokoto when he was assassinated during the junta. This left Muslim leadership in a vacuum and that of the Educational reforms he had planned to begin which is introducing the Quranic schools in its education sectors was halt. This leads the extent and idea which gave birth to the institution which will succeed for decades in Nigeria. The Islamic Educational Trust founding Trustee were Dr. Sheikh Ahmed Lemu, Alhaji Sani Ashafa Suleiman and Hajiya Aisha Bridget Lemu which the aims is to educate and build the capacity of Muslim old and younger ones towards contributing positive development in their communities.
In the beginning of the foundation, Aisha Bridget Lemu kitchen store was the first office of the IET at their house. During its first intake, both the trustees agreed Dr. Shaikh Ahmed Lemu to be its President, Alhaji Sani Ashafa Suleiman as Secretary general and Aisha Lemu to be its finance Secretary with their funds help to employ first member of the staffs. The organization were funds by the three founders with Ahmed Lemu contribute most and other international Charitable organization help in funds and introducing special partnership.
The first task of the establishment was to ensure that all schools both the public and missionary in the of North-Western State had qualified teacher for 'Islamic Religious Knowledge' which at that time there were no qualified Islamic Religious Knowledge (IRK), Parents refused sending their children to school out of concern that their religious beliefs can be compromised. IET trains and employs teachers who are good in IRK sending them to various schools within the Northern State of Nigeria justs to solve this problem. The first set of textbooks used in teaching Islamic Religion Knowledge in schools were all  written by Shaikh Ahmed Lemu, Hon. Justice Bashir Sambo and Dr. AbdurRahman Doi as of the first intake. Lemu and the first employed staff in IET late Alhaji Muhammad Wali together wrote a book about Islam using hausa language prescriptions, making it as resources and materials used to enlighten non-Muslims about Islam. One of the flagship trustee program is the Daawah Institute Nigeria. The organization recorded success within the short time of it formation and gained support and blessings from notable individual, one of them was Alhaji Sir Abubakar III Sultan of Sokoto and the then Military Governor of North-Western State Alhaji Usman Faruk. The IET had various programmes over that years, this includes the Annual Seminars for Muslim Undergraduates, Women's Classes, Daawah Mobile Corps and Weekend School. The first headquarters of IET was in Sokoto when Shaikh Lemu was serving as the Sharia Judge of the Sokoto Court of Appeal in 1975 moving its headquarters to Minna in 1976 when he was transferred to serve as the first grand khadi Shari'ah Court of Appeal at the newly created Niger State.
The founding members set up committees, Zonal department and branches for it expanding activities. The branches were established in Lagos, Abuja, Sokoto and Yola all ruled by geo zones coordinator appointed by the board of the IET. The IET has over five department under it: Daawah Institute of Nigeria (DIN), Awqaf and Investments Department, Education Department, General Administration and Resource Management and Human Welfare Department.
The Educational department under it is the management for schools established by the IET: New Horizons College Minna and Sunrise International School Abuja. The Daawah Institute Nigeria (DIN) was the main purpose of IET which it provides and develops objective, resources and method for effective and correct message in Islam. The DIN also promotes, prevent Violence of women rights in Islam striving for a greater and social justice.
IET had it founding Trustee formed a partnership with several minded organizations like the Aisha Lemu Learning Initiative, providing vocational skills training for disadvantage children's, Daawah Coordination Council of Nigeria, Association of Model Islamic Schools, Development Initiative of West Africa and the Federation of Muslim Women Associations Nigeria all involved in the community development, peace building and welfare in West Africa.
The IET grows the be increasing it new uses of technologies and the impact of the IET is traced to the clear understanding that it is a trust that must be preserved and passed on to future generations.
The IETpl priorities training, welfare and capacity building with a aim of succession planning and investment in it staff. The IET which based on Islamic and Arabic Studies publications were used in WAEC and NECO, all written by Sheikh Ahmed Lemu and Hajiya Aisha Bridget Lemu. For many year since its existence, the Muslim children in Nigeria most have reads textbooks written by Alhaji Dr. Sheikh Ahmed Lemu and his wife, late Hajiya B. Aisha Lemu with the publication of Islamic Educational Trust Headquarters based in Minna. Their obituary were carried in 2019 on the last page of the books; in 2019 the organization celebrates its 50 years of existence.

50th anniversary of IET
On the 50th anniversary of the educational trust, its donated food and medical outreach to 1000 sick orphans also sponsoring 100 orphans in educational aspect from different schools, it also has 600 staff with both Christian and impact from all region in Nigeria and some African continent.

Aims
The Islamic Education Trust (IET), aims qualities of upbringing the child education in religion to have a better Nigeria which poor leadership and corrupt practices are the menace of ravaging the Nigeria on bad child-raising.

Islamic organizations 
Most Islamic nongovernmental body establishing schools in 80s, amongst are the.

The Islamic Education Trust, (IET) Minna and Sokoto
The Islamic/Trust of Nigeria (ITN), Zaria
The Islamic Foundation, Kano
The Hudabiyyah Foundation, Kano
Federation of Muslim Women Association/of Nigeria, (FOMWAN), 
Jama’atu Izalatul Bid’ah wa Iqamatus Sunnah, (JIBWIS)
Da’awah Group of Nigeria, Kano.

Publication 
Publication works by Islamic Education Trust Minna:

 Misconceptions about Islam. 1992. , 
 Women in Daʻawah, B. Aisha Lemu, 2002, English. , 
 Should Muslim women speak: A comprehensive introduction to the Islamic textual evidence against the prohibition of Muslim women speaking in public. 2008, Justice Sheikh Ahmed Lemu, OFR
 The Boko question?prohibition or obligation?: responses to 35 common religious arguments against conventional "Western" education. 2016,
 Shari'ah intelligence: The basic principles and objectives of islamic jurisprudence; a brief introduction to Usul al-Fiqh and Maqasid al-Shari'ah, Da'wah Institute of Nigeria (DIN), Kuala Lumpur, Malaysia, 2015 - Islam ic law,

Notes

External links 
 IET official website

Islamic education in Nigeria
Islamic organizations established in 1969
Islamic organizations based in Nigeria
Educational organizations based in Nigeria